The Spanish Friar, or the Double Discovery is a tragicomedy by John Dryden, produced and published in 1681.

Characters 

 Torrismond, Son of Sancho, the deposed King, believing himself Son of Raymond.
 Bertran, a Prince of the blood.
 Alphonso, a general Officer, Brother to Raymond.
 Lorenzo, his Son.
 Raymond, a Nobleman, supposed Father of Torrismond.
 Pedro, an Officer.
 Gomez, an old Usurer.
 Dominick, the Spanish Friar.
 Leonora, Queen of Arragon.
 Teresa, Woman to Leonora.
 Elvira, Wife to Gomez.

Plot 

The tragic part of the plot concerns a usurpation. Torrismond is, unknowingly, the rightful heir to the Spanish throne. He secretly marries Leonora, the unlawful queen, under whose reign Torrismond's father, the true king, has been killed in gaol.

The comic sub‐plot is commanded by the presence of Father Dominic, the eponymous friar, a corpulent and corrupt official who speaks the language of Dissenters and procures women for the hedonistic and politically liberal Lorenzo. Ironically, it is only through Lorenzo's agency that Torrismond is restored. The girl Lorenzo has been pursuing is revealed to be his sister.

History 
The Spanish Friar appears to have been brought out shortly after Thomas Thynne's murder, which is alluded to in the Prologue, probably early in 1681–2. The whimsical caricature, which it presented to the public, in Father Dominic, was received with rapture by the prejudiced spectators, who thought nothing could be exaggerated in the character of a Roman Catholic priest. Yet, the satire was still more severe in the first edition, and afterwards considerably softened.

It was, as Dryden himself calls it, a Protestant play; Jeremy Collier says it was rare Protestant diversion, and much for the credit of the Reformation. Accordingly, the Spanish Friar was the only play prohibited by James II after his accession.

After the Revolution, the Spanish Friar was the first play represented by order of Mary II, and honoured with her presence; a choice, of which she had abundant reason to repent, as the serious part of the piece gave as much scope for malicious application against herself, as the comic against the religion of her father. An account of the public reaction, with some other particulars, is contained in a letter from the Earl of Nottingham, published by Sir John Dalrymple, from a copy given him by the Bishop of Dromore:

Notes

References

Bibliography 

 Birch, Dinah, ed. (2009). "Spanish Friar, The". In The Oxford Companion to English Literature. Oxford University Press. Oxford Reference. 
 Coltharp, Duane (1999). "Patriarchalism at Risk in "The Spanish Fryar"". SEL: Studies in English Literature 1500–1900, 39(3): pp. 427–441. 
 Scott, Walter, ed. (1808). The Works of John Dryden, Now First Collected in Eighteen Volumes. Vol. 6. Edinburgh: Printed for William Miller by James Ballantyne and Co. pp. 365–486. 
 The Spanish fryar, or, The double discovery acted at the Duke's Theatre / written by John Dryden …. London: Printed for Richard Tonson and Jacob Tonson ..., 1681.

Tragicomedy plays
1681 plays
Plays by John Dryden